Ernest William Haley (3 January 1885 – 20 February 1975) was a British track and field athlete who competed in the 1912 Summer Olympics. In 1912 he was eliminated in the semi-finals of the 400 metres competition. In the 200 metres event he was eliminated in the first round.

References

External links
profile

1885 births
1975 deaths
British male sprinters
Olympic athletes of Great Britain
Athletes (track and field) at the 1912 Summer Olympics